Claude Gauvreau (August 19, 1925 – July 7, 1971 in Montreal, Quebec) was a Canadian playwright, poet, sound poet and polemicist. He was a member of the radical Automatist movement and a contributor to the revolutionary Refus Global Manifesto.

Life and career 
Gauvreau pursued classical studies at the Collège Sainte-Marie, and graduated with a B.A in Philosophy from Université de Montréal.

He discovered modern art through his brother Pierre, who attended l'École des beaux-arts, and met painter Paul-Émile Borduas, leader of Les Automatistes. He then became an unconditional advocate of the Automatist Movement of the Montreal Surrealists, and, in 1948 contributed to the Refus Global ("Total Refusal") Manifesto, which would become a key document of Quebec and Canadian cultural history.

Between 1944 and 1947, he wrote Les Entrailles, a collection of 26 short plays or "dramatic objects". In 1947, he staged one of these plays, Bien-être, with his muse, actress Muriel Guilbault.

Following Muriel Guilbault's suicide in 1952, Gauvreau's fragile emotional stability caused him to be institutionalized ten times over eight years in Montreal psychiatric hospital Saint-Jean-de-Dieu. He continued to write, though. While working for the radio, between 1952 and 1969, he wrote several of his best known works, beginning with Beauté baroque (1952), a novel depicting the life of Muriel, as well as several collections of poems, including Sur fil métamorphose (1956), Brochuges (1956), and Étal Mixte (1968). In 1958, two of Gauvreau's short plays were performed at École des beaux-arts: La jeune fille et la lune and Les grappes lucides.

In 1956, at a time he believed he would die, Gauvreau wrote what many consider to be his masterpiece, La charge de l'orignal épormyable (The Charge of the Expormidable Moose). Set in a vaguely institutional communal home, the play revolves around Mycroft Mixeudeim, a poet who is envied, plagiarized, mocked and ultimately sacrificed by his fellow housemates. When the play finally premiered in 1970 at Le Gésu in Montreal, the production closed after only a few performances as a result of poor planning and sheer lack of audience. But three years after Gauvreau's death, in 1974, the play received a successful production at Théâtre du Nouveau Monde, and went on to receive several more productions over time in Quebec, as well as a television adaptation for Radio-Canada Television in 1992.

On March 27, 1970, he participated to La Nuit de la poésie, the greatest festival of the word that has ever taken place in Quebec. On July 7, 1971, Gauvreau fell to his death from the roof of his building. While some considered his death to be a suicide, the coroner ruled the death accidental.

Gauvreau's final full-length play, Les oranges sont vertes, premiered posthumously in 1972 at Théâtre du Nouveau Monde, and six years after his death, in 1977, Gauvreau's Complete Creative Works, containing over 1,500 pages of his poetry, prose and drama, was published in Montreal.

The art of Claude Gauvreau was revolutionary. He deconstructed, reconstructed and invented vocabulary through his own form of sound poetry, creating what he called explorean language. His life and work influenced a new generation of Canadian artists, including iconic performance poets The Four Horsemen.

Works

In English translation

 The Vampire and the Nymphomaniac / Le vampire et la nymphomane (1949), bilingual edition, translated by Ray Ellenwood. Toronto: One Little Goat Theatre Company, 2022.  The Vampire at Canadian Play Outlet
 The Charge of the Expormidable Moose (La charge de l'orignal épormyable), translated by Ray Ellenwood. Toronto: Exile Editions, 1996. 
 Entrails (Entrailles - a collection of 26 "dramatic objects" by Claude Gauvreau, 1948), translated by Ray Ellenwood. Coach House Books, 1981, Toronto: Exile Editions, 1991. 
The Lucid Clusters: Poetics of Claude Gauvreau, translated, and with an introduction by, Ray Ellenwood. Calgary: no press, 2011

In French
 Le vampire et la nymphomane / The Vampire and the Nymphomaniac (1949), publication bilingue. Toronto: One Little Goat Theatre Company, 2022.  
 Les entrailles (1948), édition par Thierry Bissonnette. Bromont, Québec: Éditions de la Grenouillère, 2022. 
Oeuvres créatrices complètes (Complete Creative Works), Ottawa: Parti pris, 1977.

Link to the 1991 edition
List of Gauvreau's works via French Wikipedia

References 

 W. H. New, ed. Encyclopedia of Literature in Canada. Toronto: University of Toronto Press, 2002: 417–18.
 Ellenwood, Ray. Egregore: a history of the Montréal automatist movement. Toronto: Exile Editions, 1992.

On Google Books

External links 
The Charge of the Expormidable Moose, 2013 English language world premiere by One Little Goat Theatre Company 
National Film Board of Canada documentary, Claude Gauvreau - Poète (1974) with footage from Gauvreau's public appearances and interviews as well as scenes from the 1974 production of The Charge of the Expormidable Moose
 
 The Canadian Encyclopedia
 Encyclopædia Britannica
 The PIP (Project for Innovative Poetry) Blog
List of Quebec authors

Canadian male poets
20th-century Canadian dramatists and playwrights
1925 births
1971 deaths
Université de Montréal alumni
1971 suicides
Accidental deaths in Quebec
Accidental deaths from falls